Werthman Grocery is located at a commercial intersection in a residential neighborhood in the West End of Davenport, Iowa, United States. While it initially housed a grocery store, the building has been a long time neighborhood tavern. It was listed on the National Register of Historic Places in 1984.

History
Henry Werthman opened a grocery store in this building in 1900. Several other members of the Werthman family lived within the one-block area in the early 20th-century. A tavern opened in the building by 1910. It was operated by John J. Bryson who lived in the second-floor apartment. A tavern has been housed here since that time, even during the Prohibition era. In those years it was listed in city directories as selling only "soft drinks".

Architecture
The neighborhood tavern was and is a fixture in what was a predominantly working-class German neighborhood of Davenport. This two-story commercial building capitalizes on its corner location by way of the building's main entrance that was placed in a chamfered corner. The oriel window on the east side indicates the location of the residential space above the tavern, which was a common feature in many of Davenport's small commercial buildings from the 19th and early 20th century. The structure is composed of brick, built on a stone foundation. Its primary decorative feature is the metal cornice, with dentil molding, finials, and ornamental frieze.

References

Commercial buildings completed in 1900
Buildings and structures in Davenport, Iowa
Commercial buildings on the National Register of Historic Places in Iowa
Drinking establishments on the National Register of Historic Places in Iowa
National Register of Historic Places in Davenport, Iowa
Grocery store buildings